Keziah Joseph (born 12 August 1992 in Hammersmith, London) is a British actress who trained at The Royal Central School of Speech and Drama. She made her professional theatre debut in Sandi Toksvig's Silver Lining (2017).  In her final year, she was nominated for The Spotlight Graduate prize, was the recipient of The Carlton Hobbs Award in 2016, and also landed the role of 'Dorothy' in the long running British radio soap opera 'The Archers', as well as the part of 'Uche' in a BFI sponsored short film entitled 'Hush'.

Award
In 2016 she received the BBC Carleton Hobbs Bursary Award, and was a Spotlight Prize nominee.

Radio

In 2016 played the part of Dorothy in BBC Radio 4's The Archers.
RADIO
 2016, Radio, Dorothy, THE ARCHERS, BBC Radio 4, Kim Greengrass
 2016, Radio, Elsie Griffiths, THE CONFIDENTIAL AGENT, BBC Radio 4 (RDC), Sally Avens
 2016, Radio, Cowslip/Clover/Nethilta, WATERSHIP DOWN, BBC Radio 4 (RDC), Gemma Jenkins & Marc Beeby
 2016, Radio, Lyeasha, THE THICKNESS BY DANIEL LAWRENCE TAYLOR, BBC Radio 4 (RDC), Jonquil Panting
 2016, Radio, Rosalie, AGNES GREY, BBC Radio 4 (RDC), Tracey Neale
 2016, Radio, Cassie, WILD THINGS BY CHARLOTTE JONES, BBC Radio 4 (RDC), Liz Webb
 2016, Radio, Harriet, NORTHANGER ABBEY, BBC Radio 4 (RDC), Sally Avens
 2016, Radio, Student 2/ Prisoner 3, ASSATA SHAKUR: THE FBI’S MOST WANTED WOMAN, BBC Radio 4 (RDC), Debbie Tucker Green
 2017, Radio, Lorna, DOCTOR WHO- COLD VENGEANCE, Big Finish Productions
 2017, Radio, Girl, THE MOTHER, BBC radio 4, Peter Kavanagh

Short film

Joseph played the part of Hush in Uche (Genesis Child Productions, Alex Campbell).

STAGE
 2017/18 Stage, Mowgli, THE JUNGLE BOOK, Royal & Derngate, Max Webster.
 2017,   Stage, Evie/Helen/Kim Kardashian/Lucy, KANYE THE FIRST, HighTide, Andrew Twyman
 2017,   Stage, Hope, SILVER LINING, Rose Theatre Kingston, Rebecca Gatwood

References

External links
 
 https://www.spotlight.com/interactive/cv/9917-0195-9071
 "Throwback Thursday" interview with Keziah Joseph

21st-century English actresses
English stage actresses
Living people
Place of birth missing (living people)
1992 births